Conospermum mitchellii, commonly known as Victorian smokebush is a shrub which is endemic to Western Victoria, Australia. It  grows  to between 1 and 2 metres high and has linear leaves that are 5 to 20 cm long and 0.8 to 3.5 mm wide. The flowers are bluish-grey in bud and open to white. These appear between July and December (mid winter to early summer) in its native range.

The species was formally described in 1856 by Swiss botanist Carl Meissner in Prodromus Systematis Naturalis Regni Vegetabilis. The type specimen was collected during Thomas Livingston Mitchell's 1836 expedition.  It occurs in the Lower Glenelg National Park, Grampians National Park and near Anglesea.

References

External links

Herbarium specimen at Royal Botanic Gardens Kew

mitchellii
Flora of Victoria (Australia)
Taxa named by Carl Meissner